β-Phellandrene synthase (neryl-diphosphate-cyclizing) (EC 4.2.3.51, phellandrene synthase 1, PHS1, monoterpene synthase PHS1) is an enzyme with systematic name neryl-diphosphate diphosphate-lyase (cyclizing; beta-phellandrene-forming). This enzyme catalyses the following chemical reaction

 neryl diphosphate  β-phellandrene + diphosphate

The enzyme from Solanum lycopersicum has very poor affinity with geranyl diphosphate.

References

External links 
 

EC 4.2.3